Garcia Live Volume Three is a three-CD album by Legion of Mary, a band led by Jerry Garcia and Merl Saunders.  It was recorded live on December 14 and 15, 1974, at the Paramount Theatre in Portland, Oregon and the EMU Ballroom in Eugene, Oregon.  It was released by ATO Records on October 15, 2013.

In addition to Garcia on guitar and vocals and Saunders on keyboards and vocals, the lineup of Legion of Mary included Martin Fierro on saxophone and flute, John Kahn on bass, and Ron Tutt on drums.  The band existed from December 1974 to July 1975.  Garcia Live Volume Three was recorded on their first tour.  They have one other live album, Legion of Mary: The Jerry Garcia Collection, Vol. 1, which was released in 2005.

Wolf, one of Garcia's guitars, is depicted on the album cover.

Critical reception

On AllMusic, Fred Thomas said, "The third installment of the Garcia Live series, an ongoing concert-recording archive for die-hard Grateful Dead and Jerry Garcia Band fans, finds over two and a half hours of previously unreleased material from a two-night stand by one of Garcia's more obscure incarnations, Legion of Mary.... With the oceanic amounts of live recordings from Garcia and the Dead, even the biggest Deadheads can get bogged down by the repetitive elements of their complete catalog of live shows. Legion of Mary represents some truly reaching and challenging sounds even for the ever-searching Garcia. It's an anomaly and a somewhat lost page in the Garcia history book, certainly one of the more interesting releases of its type, and a must-hear addition to anyone even remotely interested in the countless hours of Dick's Picks and Live/Dead material.

Track listing
Disc 1
December 14, 1974, Paramount Theatre, Portland, Oregon:
"Boogie On Reggae Woman" (Stevie Wonder) - 18:04
"The Night They Drove Old Dixie Down" (Robbie Robertson) - 7:56
"Freedom Jazz Dance" (Eddie Harris) - 13:40
"Mystery Train" (Junior Parker, Sam Phillips) - 12:30
"How Sweet It Is (To Be Loved by You)" (Brian Holland, Lamont Dozier, Eddie Holland) - 11:06
Disc 2
December 15, 1974, EMU Ballroom, Eugene, Oregon, first set:
"You Can Leave Your Hat On" (Randy Newman) - 16:27
"Neighbor, Neighbor" (Alton J. Valier) - 12:30
"The Night They Drove Old Dixie Down" (Robertson) -8:25
Disc 3
December 15, 1974, EMU Ballroom, Eugene, Oregon, second set:
"It Ain't No Use" (Jerry Williams Jr., Gary U.S. Bonds, Don Hollinger) - 13:26
"Valdez in the Country" (Donny Hathaway) - 13:26
"I Second That Emotion" (Al Cleveland, Smokey Robinson) - 14:53
"Wondering Why" (Merl Saunders, Pam Carrier) - 24:53
"Roadrunner"  (Holland, Dozier, Holland) - 12:48

Personnel
Legion of Mary
Jerry Garcia – guitar, vocals
Merl Saunders – keyboards, vocals
Martin Fierro – saxophone, flute, percussion
John Kahn – bass
Ron Tutt – drums
Production
Produced for release by Marc Allan, Joe Gastwirt
Original recordings produced by Jerry Garcia
Executive producer: Coran Capshaw
Recording: Betty Cantor-Jackson
Mastering: Joe Gastwirt
Project coordinator: Kevin Monty
Research associates: Evan Cooper, Hank Bateman
Curators: Joe Gastwirt, Marc Allen
Art direction, design, illustration: Ryan Corey
Photography: Roberto Rabanne, John Conroy
Liner notes: Darryl Norsen

References

Legion of Mary (band) live albums
Jerry Garcia live albums
Merl Saunders albums
2013 live albums